Oiapoque is a municipality in the north of the state of Amapá, Brazil. Oiapoque is also a major river in the same state, forming the international border with French Guiana. The Oyapock River Bridge, connecting the village with Saint-Georges in French Guiana, was completed in 2011 but not opened to pedestrian or vehicle traffic until 2017.

Lying on the northern coast of Brazil, Oiapoque is popularly considered the northernmost point of Brazil. The phrase do Oiapoque ao Chuí ("from Oiapoque to Chuí") means "all of Brazil." However, there are more northerly points in Roraima state such as the municipality of Uiramutã. Oiapoque remains the northernmost coastal city of Brazil, and the northernmost city of Amapá. It occupies more than half of the north border of the state.

Early history

The Oiapoque River is said to have been discovered by Vicente Yáñez Pinzón in the first years of the 16th century. It has been called Japoc, Yapoc, Iapoco, and even Vicente Pinzón River. The name Oiapoque was officially used from 1900, when a territorial dispute between Brazil and France was resolved through Swiss diplomatic arbitration.

Clevelândia

At the beginning of the 20th century, the village of Oiapoque hosted a political and criminal concentration camp called Clevelândia. In 1922 an agricultural outpost called the Núcleo Colonial Cleveland was transformed into a camp during the presidency of Arthur Bernardes (1922–1926). Many Brazilian anarchist militants were sentenced to hard labour here. Of the 946 prisoners interned at Clevelândia between 1924 and 1927, 491 died. Many of the survivors returned to São Paulo and Rio de Janeiro permanently sickened with malaria.

Geography
Oiapoque is bordered to the west by its long frontier with French Guiana. It is bordered to the north by the Atlantic Ocean. On its eastern and southern sides it borders the municipalities of Calçoene, Serra do Navio, Pedra Branca do Amapari, and Laranjal do Jari.

The municipality contains 24.15% of the  Amapá State Forest, a sustainable use conservation unit established in 2006.

Oiapoque can be accessed by air via the Oiapoque Airport.

Kuahí Museum
The Kuahí Museum was opened in 2007 by the four indigenous groups living the municipality: the Palikur, the Galibi Marwono, the Galibi do Oiapoque, and the Karipuna do Amapá. The museum contains more than 400 objects used by the Amerindians. The project was conceived in the 1990s to promote and transmit the knowledge of the indigenous community. The museum is a public not-for-profit entity linked to the Amapá State Secretariat of Culture.

Climate
Oiapoque has a tropical monsoon climate (Am) with moderate to little rainfall from August to November and heavy to very heavy rainfall in the remaining months.

Subdivisions
The municipality of Oiapoque contains three districts:

There are four indigenous tribes in the municipality located in indigenous territories:

Gallery

References

External links
 Oiapoque City Hall official website
 

Populated places established in 1945
Populated places in Amapá
Municipalities in Amapá
Extreme points of Brazil